Eddie B. Moss (born September 27, 1948) is a former American football running back in the National Football League for the St. Louis Cardinals and the Washington Redskins. He played college football at Southeast Missouri State University and was drafted by the Buffalo Bills in the 13th round of the 1972 NFL Draft.

High school and college years
Moss was a 1967 graduate of Poplar Bluff High School where he starred on both sides of the ball. He was named all-conference at linebacker and running back his senior season on a team that finished with a 9-0 record. After high school, Moss played two seasons for Centerville Community College in Iowa and then transferred to Southeast Missouri State, in Cape Girardeau. At SEMO, he led the team in rushing his junior and senior years and combined to score 16 touchdowns.

Pro career
Moss was drafted by the Buffalo Bills in 1972 but failed to make the team. He signed with the Cardinals in 1973 where he played four seasons, primarily on special teams and blocking for Terry Metcalf. The Cardinals won two NFC East division titles during his stay in St. Louis. He spent the final two years of his career in Washington before retiring after the 1978 season.

Post career
After retirement, Moss spent 27 years with the United Parcel Service and was inducted into the Missouri Sports Hall of Fame in 2016.

References

1948 births
Living people
People from Mississippi County, Arkansas
Players of American football from Arkansas
American football running backs
Southeast Missouri State Redhawks football players
St. Louis Cardinals (football) players
Washington Redskins players